Artists in the Big Top: Perplexed is a 1968 West German film written and directed by Alexander Kluge. The film is made in a collage style, featuring newsreels and quotations from philosophers alongside the story of a failing circus whose owner, Leni (Hannelore Hoger), must decide whether her dream of a new kind of circus is too optimistic. The film is a symbolic representation of Kluge's own frustrations in trying to help stimulate the New German Cinema movement.

Cast
 Hannelore Hoger as Leni Peickert
 Sigi Graue as Manfred Peickert (as Siegfried Graue)
  as Dr. Busch
 Bernd Höltz as Herr von Lueptow
 Eva Oertel as Gitti Bornemann
 Kurt Jürgens as Mackensen, Dompteur
 Gilbert Houcke as Houke, Dompteur
 Wanda Bronska-Pampuch as Frau Saizewa
 Herr Jobst as Impresario
 Hans-Ludger Schneider as Assessor Korti
 Klaus Schwarzkopf as Gerloff, Philologe

Awards
The film won the Golden Lion at the Venice Film Festival. The film was also selected as the West German entry for the Best Foreign Language Film at the 41st Academy Awards, but was not accepted as a nominee.

See also
 List of submissions to the 41st Academy Awards for Best Foreign Language Film
 List of German submissions for the Academy Award for Best Foreign Language Film

References

External links 
 

1968 films
1960s avant-garde and experimental films
German avant-garde and experimental films
West German films
1960s German-language films
German black-and-white films
Films directed by Alexander Kluge
Golden Lion winners
Circus films
1960s German films